The  New York Giants season was the franchise's 36th season in the National Football League. The Mara family was opposed to the AFL adding a team in New York, but received an indemnity fee of ten million dollars.

Offseason
With the departure of defensive coordinator Tom Landry to the expansion Cowboys, three veterans served dual roles as player-coaches. Harland Svare became the defensive coordinator, Andy Robustelli was a defensive line coach, while Jimmy Patton was a defensive backs coach.

Regular season

Late in the eighth game of the season on November 20 at Yankee Stadium, linebacker Chuck Bednarik of the Philadelphia Eagles knocked halfback Frank Gifford of the Giants unconscious and into St. Elizabeth's Hospital. Gifford was out of football for over eighteen months and the game-sealing play involving the two hall of famers is considered one of the most famous tackles in NFL history. The Giants went 6–4–2 in 1960 and finished in third place in the Eastern Conference.  As a result, the Giants missed out on the post-season: the NFL Championship Game was won by host Philadelphia. The third place game in Miami, the first of the ten Playoff Bowls, was won by Detroit at the Orange Bowl in early January.

Schedule

Game summaries

Week 1

Standings

See also
List of New York Giants seasons

References

 New York Giants on Pro Football Reference
 Giants on jt-sw.com

New York Giants seasons
New York Giants
New York Giants season
1960s in the Bronx